Trollhunters: Rise of the Titans is a 2021 American computer-animated science fantasy film directed by Johane Matte, Francisco Ruiz Velasco, and Andrew Schmidt, and written by Guillermo del Toro, Marc Guggenheim and Dan and Kevin Hageman (who also produced the film). It is the finale of the Tales of Arcadia franchise by Guillermo del Toro, which features the television series Trollhunters, 3Below and Wizards. Following a year after the events of Wizards, the Guardians of Arcadia reunite for the final time as they battle the nefarious Arcane Order, who have reawakened the primordial Titans.

It was released on Netflix on July 21, 2021, and it received generally positive reviews from critics but a mixed response from audiences and fans, with praise given to the animation and voice performances but criticism for its ending.

Plot 
Following the events of Wizards, master wizard Hisirdoux "Douxie" Casperan and former Arcane Order member Nari lure their pursuers Belloc and Skrael onto a moving subway train where they launch a surprise attack with former Trollhunter Jim Lake Jr. and his girlfriend Claire Nunez. Jim is wounded during the fight while his best friend Toby Domzaski accidentally snaps the train’s brakes, causing the train to be unable to stop, and complicating things for Prince Krel Taron, Steve Palchuck and Stuart as they are tasked to use 'trifurcate radiation' to negate the wizards' magic. It ultimately ends in the Arcane Order capturing Nari, unaware that Douxie swapped minds with her prior to her capture, the group being detained by the police before they escape.

Jim recovers in a newly rebuilt Camelot while learning his mother Barbara is engaged to his former teacher and principal, the changeling Strickler. The group are then joined by Queen Aja Tarron and matured Eli Pepperjack, Steven unknowingly making himself pregnant when he kissed Aja for the seventh time. Blinky Galadrigal relays what he learned to reveal the Order's plan to awakening the Titans and have them converge at Arcadia Oaks, the center of the universe, to unite and recreate the world by destroying the current one. At that time, Order discovers Douxie’s spell and reverts the two back to their normal bodies, but not before Nari alerts Jim, "Trollhunter make the ninth configuration, Krohnisfere will make right". The heroes enter the Round Table and discover that the Arcane Order is already preparing a ritual to break the Genesis Seals. The heroes fail to prevent the ritual from carried out with each member of the order piloting their respective titan.

The heroes split up: Claire, Blinky, Douxie’s familiar Archie, and Archie’s father Charlemagne head to the Hong Kong Trollmarket to acquire the Krohnisfere from the TrollDragon Zong-Shi; Krel leads Stuart, Steve, and Eli to retrieve Excalibur, while the rest split into two teams in an attempt to stop the titans of Skreal and a brainwashed Nari. But it ended with Strickler and his fellow changeling Nomura are killed in battle while Claire’s team manages to acquire the Krohnisfere, but are forced to leave Archie and his father behind when Belloc's titian destroys the bridge while defeating Varvatos Vex in a gigantic robotic suit of the fictional Gun Robot. The heroes reunite and Douxie restores Nari’s freewill. When asked of the Krohnisfere, Nari tells Jim that "Time unfolds differently, like a flower. Only the Trollhunter will know" before using her Titan to battle and kill Skrael in his Titan, killing herself as well. As Belloc's titan continues it advance, Blinky realizes the Titans are meant to join with a Heartstone and that the union of Trollmarket's Heartstone and Bellroc's Titan will cause the world to be reborn in fire. The group arrive ahead of Belloc while Jim realizes that the ninth configuration is meant to represent him and his friends, enabling Jim to finally pull Excalibur out of the stone. The heroes come face to face with Bellroc, who proves to be too powerful for them to handle. As Jim is left alone to face Bellroc, he comes to accept that the amulet never made him a hero and he already was one. Jim’s newly improved amulet (created with Akiridion technology, from the original blueprints from which Merlin had used when he first built the amulet and the hilt stone from Excalibur) begins to respond to Jim and flies towards him, giving him a magic/Akiridion armor which can empower Excalibur with greater power. Toby, after remembering the anti-magic radiation generator from their first encounter with the Arcane Order, uses it on Bellroc, giving Jim the opportunity to strike Bellroc with Excalibur. Jim finds a fatally hurt Toby, who has been crushed by debris and thanks his friends in his final moments with remaining eight heroes left to mourn him.

Remembering Nari's words and realizing that the Krohnisfere is meant for him to travel back in time and prevent any tragic events that happened to him and his dearest of friends, Jim decides to use to return to when he first became the Trollhunter. He gives an emotional farewell and travels back to the morning where he found the mystical amulet, making his first change to the timeline by having Toby find Merlin's amulet under the canals.

Cast

Production

Development
While planning the ending of the Netflix/DreamWorks Animation saga Tales of Arcadia, the producers, wanting it to finish with an Avengers-style crossover, debated whether to conclude it with additional Wizards episodes or a feature film, and eventually made a film because a cinematic format allowed them to "tell this story on the scope that [they] wanted and have the story be as big as [they] aspired it to be". Aware that audiences watching the film would not necessarily be familiar with the rest of the saga, a recap prologue was written for the start of the film. The film was also influenced by Marvel Studios' Avengers films, the filmmakers having taken a similar approach so audiences unfamiliar with the franchise could nevertheless enjoy the film's story. According to writer Marc Guggenheim, early production on the film happened while the studio was working on Wizards, which he felt gave the producers time to determine how to finish the saga's story. The writers included references to executive-producer Guillermo del Toro's Pacific Rim, though they were careful to not to overload the film with Pacific Rim easter eggs.

On August 7, 2020, it was revealed that Netflix and DreamWorks Animation were developing the Tales of Arcadia finale film, Trollhunters: Rise of the Titans, with Johane Matte, Francisco Ruiz Velasco, and Andrew Schmidt directing, Guillermo del Toro, Marc Guggenheim and the Dan and Kevin Hageman writing and producing the film, with Chad Hammes and Tales of Arcadia creator Guillermo del Toro executive-producing. Emile Hirsch, Lexi Medrano, Charlie Saxton, Kelsey Grammer, Alfred Molina, Steven Yeun, Nick Frost, Colin O'Donoghue, Diego Luna, Tatiana Maslany, Cole Sand, Nick Offerman, Fred Tatasciore, Brian Blessed, Kay Bess, Piotr Michael, James Hong, Tom Kenny, Angel Lin, Amy Landecker, Jonathan Hyde, Bebe Wood, Laraine Newman, and Cheryl Hines were confirmed to be part of the cast of the film.

Animation
The film was produced with a higher production budget than previous entries on the franchise and was provided by 88 Pictures, CGCG, Inc., and Original Force. The filmmakers choose to start the film with a high speed chase sequence as a way to showcase the higher budget and animation quality to the audience.

Music
Jeff Danna, who previously composed 3Below and Wizards, and Scott Kirkland composed the score for the film. Dana and Kirkland composed new themes exclusive to the film, while also including themes from the previous Tales of Arcadia series in the score.

Release
On August 7, 2020, the film was confirmed to be released in 2021. On April 27, 2021, the release date was revealed to be July 21, 2021. The project marked the first DreamWorks Animation film to be released directly on a streaming service. The movie was released on Netflix on July 21, 2021.

Reception 
Den of Geek reviewed Trollhunters: Rise of the Titans, stating that "Though brimming with stakes, Netflix's final movie installment of Guillermo del Toro's Tales of Arcadia rationalizes rather than justifies its conclusion."

Accolades

References

External links
 
 
 

2021 films
2021 computer-animated films
2021 directorial debut films
2021 fantasy films
American animated films
American animated fantasy films
Animated science fantasy films
DreamWorks Animation animated films
English-language Netflix original films
Films produced by Guillermo del Toro
Films scored by Jeff Danna
Films with screenplays by The Hageman Brothers
Tales of Arcadia
2020s English-language films
2020s American films